Aasne Linnestå (born 3 December 1963) is a Norwegian author, lyricist, and literature critic.

Linnestå is interested in the history of ideas, and studied at the Forfatterstudiet i Bø. She is a freelance writer for Morgenbladet and runs courses in creative writing.

As of 2021, she lives in Svartskog, Nordre Follo.

Awards and honours
 2016, Mads Wiel Nygaard's Endowment

Bibliography
Små, hellige løgner – poetry (2000)
Stanislaw. En forestilling – poetry (2002)
Utland – novel (2005)
Krakow – novel (2007)
Hagesang – novel (2011)
Morsmål – poetry (2012)

References

External links
 Aasne Linnestå at Dagbladet Authors
 Aasne Linnestå at NRK Authors
 Audiatur: About Aasne Linnestå's poetry

1963 births
Living people
21st-century Norwegian novelists
20th-century Norwegian poets
21st-century Norwegian poets
Norwegian women poets
20th-century Norwegian women writers
21st-century Norwegian women writers